WAMP ("Windows, Apache, MySQL, and PHP") is an application server platform.

WAMP or Wamp may also refer to:

 WAMP (FM), a radio station (88.1 FM) licensed to Jackson, Tennessee, United States
 Web Application Messaging Protocol, a network protocol
 Zach Wamp, Republican politician representing the 3rd Congressional district of Tennessee
 Braintree Wamps, the team name of Braintree High School

See also 
 "Wamp Wamp (What It Do)", a 2006 song by Clipse from Hell Hath No Fury
 
 Wamp'u (disambiguation)

de:LAMP#Varianten
fr:WAMP